F.C. Copenhagen won the Danish Superliga throphy and competed in UEFA Champions League in the season 2006-07. The championship was secured on 9 May 2007 after winning 1–0 at Brøndby Stadion against arch rivals Brøndby IF.

On August 23, Copenhagen qualified for the UEFA Champions League as the first Danish team since 1998 after eliminating Ajax 3–2 on aggregate. In the group stage, they finished last in their group despite earning seven points.

Copenhagen lost the finals in both the Royal League and Danish Cup against Brøndby and Odense Boldklub respectively.

Competitions
For the 2006–07 season, Copenhagen competed in the Danish Superliga, Danish Cup, UEFA Champions League and Royal League.

Danish Superliga

In the Superliga they were at the winter break placed first, with only one defeat and four draws after 18 matches. Their biggest wins was with 3–0 against Viborg FF and Vejle Boldklub at Parken on respectively 22 and October 29.

The only autumn defeat was against Aalborg BK on August 27, where they lost 2–0 at Parken.

On 5 May 2007 they got their second defeat, again against Aalborg BK at Parken. That match ended 1–2. Their final loss was 19 days later against Esbjerg fB home with 1–2.

The championship was secured on May 9 after winning 1–0 at Brøndby Stadion against arch rivals Brøndby IF.

In season's last match, on 27 May, Copenhagen played a 0–0 draw against already-relegated Vejle at Vejle Stadion.

Danish Cup
See also 2006–07 Danish Cup
In the Danish Cup, Copenhagen began in the third round against Thisted FC at Lerpytter Stadion. Copenhagen won 4–1 on penalty shootout following a 1–1 draw after full-time. Hjalte Nørregaard scored for FCK and Daniel Kristensen scored for Thisted.

In the fourth round, Copenhagen played at home against Esbjerg fB, winning 3–1. Former FCK player Jesper Bech scored for Esbjerg after four minutes, but Fredrik Berglund and Hjalte Nørregaard scored the three goals for FCK in front of 10,000 spectators at Parken Stadium.

In the quarter-finals, FC Midtjylland awaited at SAS Arena in Herning. After 90 minutes, the scoreline was 2–2, after FCK-goals by Fredrik Berglund and Dan Thomassen and in the extra time Brede Hangeland made it 3–2 for FCK.

In the semi finals the opponent was 1st Division leaders Lyngby Boldklub. The first match at Lyngby Stadion ended with a 3–2 win for FCK, where Berglund had scored twice, and Nørregaard score 6 minutes before full-time. The second leg at Parken was a display of skills as FCK won 4–0; Aílton José Almeida, Fredrik Berglund and Hjalte Nørregaard scored for FCK, while the goal for 2–0 was an own goal by Lyngby debutant Brian Hämäläinen.

In the final Odense Boldklub was waiting, and Michael Hemmingsen's troops showed that FCK still had a hangover after the championship was secured 8 days earlier. The match ended 1–2, although Atiba Hutchinson made it 1–0 for FCK after 15 minutes.

UEFA Champions League

See also 2006–07 UEFA Champions League
In the Champions League, FCK started in the 2nd qualifying round, where they faced Finnish MyPa. First match was played at Parken Stadium, and FCK won 2–0 after goals by André Bergdølmo, a penalty kick, and Michael Gravgaard. The return match were played at Saviniemi, and that match ended 2–2 after goals by Fredrik Berglund, Eero Peltonen (MyPa), Tobias Linderoth and Saku Puhakainen (MyPa). FCK went through to next round with 4–2 agg.

In the third qualifying round, Dutch side Ajax Amsterdam was waiting, but after a strong start, FCK lost 1–2 at home ground Parken Stadium, after goals by Ajax's Klaas-Jan Huntelaar (twice) and FCK's Brede Hangeland. In the return match at Amsterdam ArenA on August 23 FC Copenhagen turned the tie around by defeating Ajax 0–2, including an own goal by Thomas Vermaelen, and thereby qualifying for the UEFA Champions League group stage with a 3–2 aggregate scoreline.

The draw was made on August 24 and FCK came out of the hat in Group F along with Manchester United, Benfica & Celtic.

The first group stage match were against Benfica at Parken Stadium. That match ended with a 0–0 draw. The second match were played at Celtic Park against Celtic, who won 1–0. The goal was scored on a penalty kick. In the third match they played, they lost 3–0 to Manchester United at Old Trafford. They however went on to beat Manchester United 1–0 in the fourth match, thanks to a Marcus Allbäck goal. Copenhagen lost their hope on further European matches at Estádio da Luz against Benfica where the match was closed after only 16 minutes where Benfica came in front 2–0, in a match that ended 3–1. Allbäck scored Copenhagen's goal in the 89th minute.

Their most successful and least important match was the last, where they beat Celtic by 3 to 1 at Parken, after goals by Atiba Hutchinson, Jesper Grønkjær and Marcus Allbäck.

Royal League
See also 2006–07 Royal League
In the group stage F.C. Copenhagen were in group 2 with the archrivals Brøndby IF, Swedish Hammarby IF and Norwegian Lillestrøm S.K. in the group 2. FCK won three matches and FCK qualified for the quarter finals, where they met IF Elfsborg.

The match ended 1–2 at Borås Arena after goals by Hjalte Nørregaard and Michael Silberbauer. In the semi finals, FCK drew the Swedish team, Helsingborgs IF, who was without their big star Henrik Larsson. The match was played at Parken and FCK won 3–1. Fredrik Berglund score twice in the first 15 minutes and Aílton José Almeida scored the game's last goal in the 32nd minute.

F.C. Copenhagen lost in the 2007 Royal League Final, after Martin Ericsson scored on a penalty shoot for Brøndby at Brøndby Stadion. This was the only goal in the quite boring final. For the first time, FCK did not win the Royal League.

Squads
The following squads, are lists with all the players, who have played in FC København in the 2006-07 season.

First team

Reserve team

Transfers

Players In

Players out

Competition statistics

Danish Superliga

Classification

Results summary

Results
Results for F.C. Copenhagen for season 2006-2007.

NOTE: scores are written FCK first

Key:
DSL = Danish Superliga
DC = Danish Cup
CLQ = UEFA Champions League Qualifier
CLF = UEFA Champions League Group F
RLB = Royal League Group B
RL4 = Royal League Quarter final
RLS = Royal League Semi final
F = Friendly match

Report explanation
FCK in Danish
UEFA in English

Player statistics

Honours
The Autumn Profile (2006): Michael Gravgaard
The Golden Goalie (2006): Jesper Christiansen
Profile of the year in the Superliga (2006): Michael Gravgaard
Superliga Player of the Year (2006): Tobias Linderoth
Best Swedish Midfielder (2006): Tobias Linderoth
Best Swedish Forward (2006): Marcus Allbäck
Player of the Year (2006–07): Jesper Grønkjær
Team of the Year (2006): Jesper Christiansen, Lars Jacobsen and Michael Gravgaard

See also
2006–07 Danish Superliga
2006–07 Danish Cup
2006–07 UEFA Champions League
2006–07 Royal League

F.C. Copenhagen seasons
Copenhagen